Resolved may refer to:

 Resolved (film), a 2007 documentary
 Resolved White (c. 1615-after 1687), a child passenger on the Mayflower

See also
 Resolve (disambiguation)
 Resolution (disambiguation)